Aureliu Ciocoi (born 5 June 1968) is a Moldovan diplomat who has served as Acting Prime Minister of Moldova between 2020 and 2021, as Minister of Foreign Affairs since 9 November 2020. He also served as foreign minister in 2019 and, prior to that, as the ambassador to Germany, Denmark, China, and the United States.

Ciocoi was named acting prime minister on 31 December 2020 after Ion Chicu, who submitted his resignation a week earlier, refused to stay on in an acting capacity until a new government was formed.

Biography 
Aureliu Ciocoi was born on 5 June 1968 in Chișinău. He graduated from the Primary, Secondary and High School No. 11 (today the Lyceum "Ion Creangă"). From 1986 to 1988, he was a soldier in the Soviet Border Troops of the KGB. Between 1985 and 1992, he studied at the Faculty of Journalism and Communication Sciences of the Moldova State University. From 1992 to 1994, he studied at the Faculty of International Relations of the National University of Political Studies and Public Administration in Bucharest, Romania. While studying at the university, he worked at the Central Publishing House in Chișinău.

After the fall of the Soviet Union, he became a journalist for several daily newspapers. He worked as ambassador to Germany and Denmark from 2010 to 2015, as well as to China and Vietnam from 2015 to 2017. He also briefly served as ambassador to the United States in 2017. From 2018 to 2019, he was an adviser to President Igor Dodon on foreign policy issues. After resigning from the cabinet on 9 November, he was appointed as foreign minister once again. On 31 December 2020, President Maia Sandu appointed him as interim prime minister after Prime Minister Ion Chicu resigned on 23 December.

Personal life 
He is married and has one child. He speaks fluent Romanian, Russian, English, German, and French. He was a sportsman in the 1980s, being a Master of Sport of the USSR and a member of the Moldovan national junior team in shooting. His hobbies include philosophy, literature, and theater.

Awards 
 Great Cross of Merit of the Federal Republic of Germany (November 2015)

References

1968 births
Living people
Ambassadors of Moldova to China
Ambassadors of Moldova to Germany
Ambassadors of Moldova to the United States
Diplomats from Chișinău
Foreign ministers of Moldova
Prime Ministers of Moldova
Recipients of the Order of Merit of the Federal Republic of Germany